The following is a list of notable people from Scarsdale, New York.

Arts
 Cabot Lyford, sculptor
 Stephanie Stebich, art historian and museum director
 Emmett Watson, illustrator

Business
 Eric Mindich, founder of the hedge fund Eton Park Capital Management and the youngest person to ever make partner at Goldman Sachs, was raised in Scarsdale
 Harry Wilson, businessman
 David Stern, Commissioner of National Basketball Association
 George Zimmer, founder of Men's Wearhouse, was raised in Scarsdale
 Andrew R. Jassy, founder of AWS and CEO of Amazon.com, was raised in Scarsdale
 Lauren Hobart, CEO and Chairwomen of Dick's Sporting Goods and Board Member of Yum! Brands
 Christopher Radko, Christmas ornaments designer
 David Siegel (computer scientist), founder of Two Sigma
 Daniel Och, founder of Och-Ziff
 Mark Bezos, early Amazon investor and brother of Jeff Bezos
 Jon Oringer, founder and CEO of Shutterstock, was raised in Scarsdale

Criminals
 Joseph DiNapoli, Italian American mobster
 Robert Hanssen, Soviet spy; lived at 150 Webster Road in Scarsdale, 1978–1981; his children attended Immaculate Heart of Mary School
 Benjamin (Bugsy) Siegel, gangster and Las Vegas resort builder; owned a house in Scarsdale from 1929 on; was increasingly absent in later years but his family continued to live there

Legal
 Preet Bharara, lawyer who served as the United States Attorney for the Southern District of New York from 2009 to 2017.
 William Glendon, lawyer who argued the Pentagon Papers case before the United States Supreme Court on behalf of The Washington Post

Other

 Edgar Fiedler (1929–2003), economist
 Lauren Spierer, student who disappeared from Indiana University in 2011

Media, music and entertainment
 Jacqueline Alemany, American journalist and political reporter
 Bruce Beck, television sportscaster for WNBC-TV
 Joan Bennett, Hollywood actress from the 1930s and 40s; once owned a home on Chase Road North
 Aaron Brown, former host of CNN's NewsNight with Aaron Brown; once resided in Scarsdale
 Dorothy Dalton, silent-film actress
 Lisa Donovan, YouTube celebrity (LisaNova); former featured cast member of MadTV; graduated from Scarsdale High School in 1998
 Jimmy Fink, New York radio personality for WPLJ K-Rock and 107.1 The Peak WXPK
 Judy Garland, actress; lived at 1 Cornell Street
 Rupert Holmes, composer and writer; once resided in Scarsdale
 Al Jolson, 30s film star; owned a house on Fenimore Road in Scarsdale
 Joseph Kaiser, opera, theater, and film actor; grew up in Scarsdale
 Zach Kornfeld, member of The Try Guys
 David Lascher, actor, Hey Dude, Blossom, Sabrina the Teenage Witch, and Beverly Hills, 90210; born and raised in Scarsdale
 Mara Liasson, NPR political correspondent, graduated from Scarsdale (Alternative) High School in 1983.
 Susan Lucci, actor, star of soap TV series All My Children
 Linda McCartney, actress, writer, cinematographer, producer, photographer; wife of Beatles star Paul McCartney; attended Scarsdale High School
 Liza Minnelli, singer and actress; lived in Scarsdale with her mother, Judy Garland; attended Scarsdale High School; toured Europe and Israel in an SHS production of The Diary of Anne Frank
 Yoko Ono, singer; her family moved to Scarsdale in the early 1950s; she later joined them from Japan
 Bill Pankow, film editor, The Black Dahlia, Assault on Precinct 13, Paid In Full
Robert Pine, actor,"CHiPs",was raised in Scarsdale but born in New York City, also the father of Chris Pine
 Noah Schnapp (born 3 October 2004) is an American actor known for his portrayal of Will Byers in the Netflix science fiction series Stranger Things.
 Cevin Soling, filmmaker, musician, and writer; born and raised in Scarsdale
 Too Much Joy, alternative rock band; formed in Scarsdale and three of its four members went to Scarsdale High School
 Nina Totenberg, NPR legal correspondent; graduate of Scarsdale High School
 Ellen Weiss, four-time Peabody award-winning journalist, former NPR vice-president of news; graduate of Scarsdale High School
 Robert Durst, star of HBO documentary series The Jinx (miniseries) grew up in Scarsdale

Political figures

 Otto Dohrenwend, chairman of the anti-Communist "Committee of Ten" during the 1950s
 Richard Charles Albert Holbrooke (1941–2010), diplomat, magazine editor, author, professor, Peace Corps official, and investment banker; graduated SHS 1958
 David Dean Rusk (1909–1994), US Secretary of State, 1961–1969, under presidents Kennedy and Johnson 
 Daniel D. Tompkins, sixth Vice President of the United States; born in Scarsdale

Science and technology
 Raymond Ditmars, pioneering herpetologist, author, and long-time curator at the Bronx Zoo, lived and died in Scarsdale.
 Jonathan Haidt, social psychologist and Professor of Ethical Leadership at New York University's Stern School of Business, raised in Scarsdale.
 Jeffrey A. Hoffman, astronaut; born in Brooklyn but considers Scarsdale to be his hometown; SHS graduate
Maynard Holliday, robotics engineer and Senior Technology Officer at The Pentagon
 Brewster Kahle, Internet pioneer; founded Wide Area Information Servers, Alexa Internet, Internet Archive
 Frank McDowell Leavitt, early engineer and inventor; patent for manufacturing tin cans; inventor of Bliss-Leavitt torpedo
 Benoit Mandelbrot, French mathematician, IBM research scientist and father of fractal geometry
 Ivan Sutherland, computer graphics pioneer; SHS 1955 graduate
 Herman Tarnower, author of The Complete Scarsdale Medical Diet

Sports
 Herman Barron (1909–1978), professional golfer
 Bill Bavasi, Major League Baseball executive; born in Scarsdale
 Trenten Anthony Beram, Double Gold Medalist sprinter born in Scarsdale representing the Philippines
 Nick Civetta (born 1989), rugby lock/flanker; born in Scarsdale
 Benny Feilhaber (born 1985), soccer midfielder who plays for Sporting Kansas City; moved to Scarsdale at the age of six from Brazil
 Joe Garagiola (1926–2016), catcher for the St. Louis Cardinals, Pittsburgh Pirates, Chicago Cubs and New York Giants; later a popular sportscaster and TV personality; he and his wife raised their children in Scarsdale
 Frank Gifford (1930–2015), New York Giants star running back; ABC Monday Night Football broadcaster; married to Kathie Lee Gifford
 Lindsay Gottlieb, assistant coach for the Cleveland Cavaliers; born and raised in Scarsdale
 Paul Heyman, professional wrestling manager and former promoter, known for his role in Extreme Championship Wrestling
 Yanni Hufnagel, college basketball coach
 Bill Mazer (1920–2013), New York sports talk and talk show personality; resided in Quaker Ridge from the mid-1960s until his death in 2013
 Allie Sherman, former Philadelphia Eagles quarterback and New York Giants head coach
 Brandon Steiner, founder and CEO of Steiner Sports
 David Stern, former commissioner of the NBA
 Hugh White, captain of the 1901 national champion University of Michigan football team, winners of first Rose Bowl (1902), combined score for season (550-0); engineer and businessman; Scarsdale village president

Writers
 Jacob M. Appel, short-story writer ("Creve Coeur"), playwright (Arborophilia), bioethicist; SHS graduate
 James Fenimore Cooper (1789–1851), his classic book The Spy is set in a Scarsdale historical home, The Locusts
 Laura Dave, author, graduated from SHS in 1995
 Eve Ensler, dramatist, raised in Scarsdale, attended SHS
 David Galef, writer and editor of children's books, anthologies of poetry and short fiction, essays, and literary criticism;  raised in Scarsdale
 Gish Jen (pseudonym of Lillian Jen), novelist; born in Scarsdale, 1956; a thinly disguised version of Scarsdale is a subject of some of her works
 Richard Kostelanetz, writer and artist; graduated from SHS in 1958
 Nicholas Kristof, journalist and columnist for the New York Times; twice winner of the Pulitzer Prize, most recently in 2006 for columns regarding the humanitarian crisis in Darfur
 Harry M. Lydenberg, an American librarian, author and book conservationist. Best known as a long-time director for the New York Public Library.
 Esther Morgan McCullough, novelist and anthologist, died in Scarsdale but is buried in Bennington, Vermont.
 Dan O'Brien, playwright and poet, The Body of an American, War Reporter; 1992 SHS graduate
 Bryan Reynolds, critical theorist, playwright; graduated SHS in 1983
 Carl Schorske, historian and author of Fin-de-Siècle Vienna: Politics and Culture  with his sister,
 Alan Schwarz, reporter for the New York Times; author of The Numbers Game; grew up in Scarsdale and graduated from SHS in 1986
 Robert Paul Smith novelist and playwright, Where Did You Go? Out. What Did You Do? Nothing and The Tender Trap; husband of children's book author and illustrator Elinor Goulding
 Nikita Singh, author
 Aaron Sorkin, writer and creator of TV series Sports Night and The West Wing;   raised in Scarsdale
 Andrew Ross Sorkin, financial columnist for the New York Times; editor of DealBook, an online financial daily report; graduated SHS in 1995
 Florence Wald, former dean of the Yale School of Nursing; founder of American Hospice
 Sheryl WuDunn, Pulitzer Prize-winning journalist and columnist for the New York Times; married to Nicholas D. Kristof, also a columnist for The Times

References

Scarsdale, New York
Scarsdale